Estheria is a genus of bristle flies in the family Tachinidae.

Species

Estheria acuta (Portschinsky, 1881)
Estheria albipila Mesnil, 1963
Estheria alticola Mesnil, 1967
Estheria angustifrons (Portschinsky, 1881)
Estheria atripes Villeneuve, 1920
Estheria bohemani (Rondani, 1862)
Estheria buccata (Emden, 1947)
Estheria bucharensis (Kolomiets, 1974)
Estheria cinerea (Townsend, 1919)
Estheria cinerella Mesnil, 1967
Estheria cristata (Meigen, 1826)
Estheria crosi (Villeneuve, 1920)
Estheria flavipennis Herting, 1968
Estheria graeca (Roder, 1888)
Estheria iberica Estheria, 2003
Estheria intermedia Lahiri, 2003
Estheria lacteipennis Mesnil, 1967
Estheria latigena (Villeneuve, 1911)
Estheria lesnei (Villeneuve, 1912)
Estheria litoralis (Rondani, 1862)
Estheria maculipennis Herting, 1968
Estheria magna (Baranov, 1935)
Estheria microcera Robineau-Desvoidy, 1830
Estheria nigripes (Villeneuve, 1920)
Estheria notopleuralis (Emden, 1947)
Estheria pallicornis (Loew, 1873)
Estheria petiolata (Bonsdorff, 1866)
Estheria picta (Meigen, 1826)
Estheria simonyi (Brauer & Bergenstamm, 1891)
Estheria surda (Curran, 1933)
Estheria tatianae (Kolomiets, 1974)
Estheria turneri (Emden, 1947)
Estheria vicina Robineau-Desvoidy, 1830

References

Diptera of Europe
Diptera of North America
Dexiinae
Tachinidae genera
Taxa named by Jean-Baptiste Robineau-Desvoidy